Marcus Raboy (born November 30, 1965) is an American film and music video director.

Since the early 1990s, Raboy has amassed a large number music video credits directing music videos for Mary J. Blige, Dixie Chicks, Rihanna, Luther Vandross, Shakira, Santana, and Westlife among other notable artists.

His feature film credits are Friday After Next (2002) and Janky Promoters (2009) both starring Ice Cube and Mike Epps.

Raboy grew up in New York City and attended New York University. He is managed by David Naylor & Associates and currently resides in Los Angeles, California.

Music videos

1991
 Naughty by Nature – "O.P.P." (co-directed with Rodd Houston)

1992
 A.D.O.R. - "Let It All Hang Out"
 Mary J. Blige – "Real Love"
 Mary J. Blige – "Reminisce"
 EPMD featuring K-Solo & Redman – "Head Banger"
 Pete Rock & C.L. Smooth – "They Reminisce Over You (T.R.O.Y.)"
 Ice Cube – "Wicked"
 Da Lench Mob – "Guerillas in tha Mist"

1993
 Run–D.M.C. – "Down with the King" 
 Sting – "Demolition Man"
 Faith No More and Boo-Yaa T.R.I.B.E. – "Another Body Murdered"
 Lisa Stansfield – "Little Bit of Heaven"
 P.M. Dawn – "Plastic"

1994
 Ice Cube – "You Know How We Do It"
 Pete Rock & C.L. Smooth – "I Got a Love"

1995
 Faith Evans – "Soon As I Get Home"
 Faith No More – "Digging the Grave" (credited as Alan Smithee)
 Mary J. Blige – "You Bring Me Joy"
 Rancid – "Time Bomb"

1996
 Busta Rhymes – "It's a Party"
 Faith Evans – "I Just Can't"
 Luscious Jackson – "Naked Eye"

1997
 Sting & Pras – "Roxanne '97" (Puff Daddy remix)

1999
 Black Rob – "You Don't Know Me"
 112 – "Your Letter"
 LFO – "Summer Girls"
 Santana featuring Rob Thomas – "Smooth" 
 Faith Evans – "Never Gonna Let You Go"
 Rah Digga – "Tight"
 112 – "Love You Like I Did"
 Mary J. Blige – "Deep Inside"
 Goodie Mob featuring Big Boi and Backbone – "Get Rich to This"

2000
 Guru featuring Angie Stone – "Keep Your Worries"
 Santana featuring The Product G&B – "Maria Maria"
 Montell Jordan – "Once Upon a Time"
 Carl Thomas – "I Wish"
 The Notorious B.I.G. featuring Junior M.A.F.I.A. – "Biggie"
 Santana featuring Everlast – "Put Your Lights On"
 Lil' Zane featuring 112 – "Callin' Me"
 Lil' Kim – "No Matter What They Say"
 Carl Thomas – "Summer Rain"
 Guru featuring Angie Stone – "Street Soul"
 Wyclef Jean featuring Mary J. Blige – "911"
 Carl Thomas – "Emotional"
 Musiq Soulchild – "Just Friends (Sunny)"
 Dream – "He Loves U Not"
 Babyface – "Reason for Breathing"

2001
 Olivia – "Bizounce"
 Jon B. – "Don't Talk"
 Dream – "This Is Me"
 Staind – "Fade"
 Backstreet Boys – "More than That"
 Faith Evans featuring Ja Rule, Vita & Caddillac Tah – "Good Life"
 LFO – "Every Other Time"
 O-Town – "All or Nothing"
 Luther Vandross – "Take You Out"
 O-Town – "We Fit Together"

2002
 Dixie Chicks – "Long Time Gone"
 Westside Connection – "It's the Holidaze"
 Luther Vandross – "Can Heaven Wait?"

2004
 Westlife - "Ain't That a Kick in the Head"
 Westlife - "Smile"
 Westlife - "Fly Me to the Moon"
 Wyclef Jean – "Take Me as I Am"
 Twista featuring R. Kelly – "So Sexy"
 Marc Anthony – "¿Ahora Quién?"
 Shania Twain & Billy Currington – "Party for Two" (Country version)
 Shania Twain & Mark McGrath – "Party for Two" (Pop version)

2005
 Tsunami Relief: Mary J. Blige, Andrea Bocelli, Phil Collins, Robert Downey Jr., Josh Groban, Elton John, Kelly Osbourne, Ozzy Osbourne, P!nk, Gavin Rossdale, Ringo Starr, Gwen Stefani, Rod Stewart, Steven Tyler and Velvet Revolver –  "Tears in Heaven"
 Josh Kelley – "Only You"
 Rihanna – "If It's Lovin' that You Want"
 Floetry featuring Common – "SupaStar"
 SHeDAISY – "God Bless the American Housewife"
 Lola – "No Strings"

2006
 Bubba Sparxxx featuring Ying Yang Twins – "Ms. New Booty"
 50 Cent featuring Olivia – "Best Friend"
 Ice Cube – "Why We Thugs"
 Pitbull featuring Lil Jon and Ying Yang Twins "Bojangles"
 Lil Scrappy – "Gangsta Gangsta"
 Danity Kane – "Ride for You"
 Ice Cube featuring Snoop Dogg and Lil Jon – "Go to Church"
 Lil Scrappy featuring Sean P of YoungBloodZ and E-40 – "Oh Yeah (Work)"

2007
 Katharine McPhee – "Love Story"
 Sean Kingston – "Beautiful Girls"
 The Cheetah Girls – "Fuego"

2008
 K'naan – "ABCs"

2010
 Mary J. Blige featuring Jay Sean – "Each Tear"
 Shakira – "Waka Waka (This Time for Africa)"

2011
 Avril Lavigne – "What the Hell"
 Charice – "One Day"

2012
Whitney Houston & Jordin Sparks – "Celebrate"

Other directing credits
 Friday After Next (2002)
 Platinum (2003, 1 episode)
 The Life and Times of Marcus Felony Brown (2008, TV film)
 Janky Promoters (2009)
 Paul F. Tompkins: Crying & Driving (2015)
Vir Das: Abroad Understanding (2017)
 Pete Holmes: Dirty Clean (2018)
 Anthony Jeselnik: Fire In The Maternity Ward (2019)

References

External links

1965 births
American music video directors
Living people
New York University alumni
Film directors from New York City